Appam (also known as Aappam) or āppa in Sri Lanka is a type of thin pancake originating from South India and Sri Lanka. It is made with fermented rice batter and coconut milk, traditionally cooked in an appachatti, a deep pan similar in shape to a wok. It is part of Kerala and Tamil cuisine found in the Indian states of Tamil Nadu and Kerala and Sri Lanka.  Appam are most frequently served for breakfast or dinner, often with a topping such as an egg.

History

Vir Sanghvi, an Indian journalist, quotes food historian K. T. Achaya and states that the appam is mentioned in the Tamil Sangam literature. Achaya states that appam was well-established in ancient Tamil country as mentioned in Sangam, with poems also describing appam along with modakam being sold at street markets in ancient city of Madurai.

Other historians have theorized that appam actually began with the Cochin Jews who settled in the Kerala region of India around the 1st century. They created a particular style of appam that is fermented with fresh toddy instead of yeast.

Variations

Idiyappam
Idiyappam (string hopper or noolputtu) is made from rice noodles curled into flat spirals. It is served for breakfast with a thin curry of fish or chicken, containing only one or two pieces of meat, a dhal (lentil) dish, and a spicy sambol or fresh chutney. Kiri hodi or sodhi, a type of coconut milk curry, is another popular accompaniment to idiyappam. String hoppers are made from steamed rice flour made into a dough with water and a little salt, and forced through a mould similar to those used for pasta to make the strings. They are cooked by steaming. Some people even sprinkle grated coconut on the rice noodles. These hoppers can be bought ready-made. In India and Sri Lanka, String Hoppers can be served as both a breakfast meal and as dinner. There are many variations to hoppers, depending on, for example, the type of flour used. This simple dish can be adapted into other foods such as string hopper biriyani, by adding scrambled eggs or vegetables.

Achappam
Achappam is a deep-fried rose cookie made with rice. It is a signature Syrian Christian food.

Kuzhalappam
Kuzhalappam is a typical Syrian Christian dish which is a fried crisp curled up like a tube.

Neyyappam
Neyyappam owes its origins to Kerala and has been a traditional offering in Hindu temples for God. It is made with rice flour, jaggery, clarified butter ghee, which is the traditional method of making Nei appam. Again, the different culture and religious practices introduced variations to the dish as described in the citation above

Unni appam is a variation in which mashed plantain is added to the batter. The batter is made out of rice flour, jaggery and plantain is poured into a vessel called appakarai or appakaram, which has ghee heated to a high temperature. The appams take the shape of small cups and are fried until deep brown.

Pesaha appam
Pesaha appam is made by Nasrani Christians in Kerala during Pesaha (Passover).  This type of appam is dipped in syrup or Pesaha Pal (Passover Coconut Milk) before being served.

Vattayappam

Vattayappam is made from rice flour, sugar, and coconut. It is an oil free tea time snack in majority of households in Kerala. The dish is made by steam-cooking the batter, and is very similar to the bánh bò from Vietnam.

Burmese apon 
Appam, called apon in Burmese, is a common street food in Burmese cuisine. It is considered a delicacy of Southern Myanmar, in coastal towns like Dawei and Myeik.

Kue apem

In Indonesia, a variant of appam is known as kue apem or kue apam. It is an Indonesian kue or traditional cake of steamed dough made of rice flour, coconut milk, yeast and palm sugar, usually served with grated coconut. Indonesian households or community traditionally communally made kue apem for celebration and festivities. For example, Keraton Yogyakarta traditionally held Ngapem ceremony, where royal household communally cook kue apem (Javanese version of appam) as a part of Tingalan Jumenengan Dalem ceremony. It is quite similar to kue mangkok. Just like kue putu it is derived from Indian influence on Indonesian cuisine.

See also
 Apam balik
 Dosa (food) 
 Uttapam
 List of fermented foods
 List of Indian breads
 List of pancakes

References

Fermented foods
Tamil cuisine
Sri Lankan pancakes
Indian breads
Kerala cuisine
Articles containing video clips
Sri Lankan egg dishes
Indian cuisine
Indonesian breads
Indonesian pancakes
Javanese cuisine